Sofia Kenin was the defending champion, but lost in the semifinals to Ajla Tomljanović.

Amanda Anisimova won the title after Tomljanović withdrew from the final.

Seeds

Draw

Finals

Top half

Bottom half

References
Main Draw

FSP Gold River Women's Challenger - Singles
FSP Gold River Women's Challenger